The DePaul Blue Demons men's soccer team is the intercollegiate soccer program representing DePaul University. The school competes in the Big East Conference in Division I of the National Collegiate Athletic Association (NCAA).

Seasons

Year-by-year

NCAA Tournament history 
DePaul has appeared in one NCAA Tournament. Their most recent performance came in 2008. Their combined NCAA record is 0–1–0.

References

External links